The Great Bridge over the Charles River connected Cambridge, Massachusetts, to what is now known as Allston, Boston, Massachusetts. The Great Bridge was built in 1660–1662 at what was then called Brighton Street, and was the first bridge to span the Charles. A toll was authorized in 1670. The bridge was rebuilt in 1862.

The Great Bridge was at the site of the modern-day Anderson Memorial Bridge, which connects John F. Kennedy Street in Cambridge to North Harvard Street in Allston.

References

Bridges completed in 1662
Bridges over the Charles River
Buildings and structures in Cambridge, Massachusetts
Bridges in Boston
Bridges in Middlesex County, Massachusetts
Road bridges in Massachusetts
Former toll bridges in Massachusetts
1662 establishments in Massachusetts